Pantelis (Greek) is a name of Greek origin that is the given name of:

 Pantelis Horn, a Greek naval officer and playwright of Austrian origins
 Pantelis Kafes, a Greek footballer 
 Pantelis Kapetanos, a Greek football player 
 Pantelis Karasevdas, a Greek shooter
 Pantelis Konstantinidis, a Greek footballer 
Pantelis Pantelidis, Greek singer-songwriter
 Pantelis Zervos, a Greek theatrical and film actor

See also
Pantelić, Serbian surname

Greek masculine given names